Francesco Cereo de Mayda (1568 – 23 August 1626) was a Roman Catholic prelate who served as Bishop of Lavello (1621–1626).

Biography
Francesco Cereo de Mayda was born in Maida, Italy and ordained a friar in the Order of Minims.
On 29 March 1621, he was appointed by Pope Gregory XV as Bishop of Lavello. 
He served as Bishop of Lavello until his death on 23 August 1626.

References

External links and additional sources
 (Chronology of Bishops) 
 (Chronology of Bishops) 

17th-century Italian Roman Catholic bishops
1568 births
1626 deaths
Bishops appointed by Pope Gregory XV